The Hertfordshire Senior County League is a football competition based in Hertfordshire, England. Founded in 1898, there are currently two divisions at senior level and two divisions at reserve and development level. Sitting at step 7 of the National League System, the Premier Division is a feeder to the Spartan South Midlands Football League. The League operates a knock-out competition called the 'Aubrey Cup' and New Salamis are the current holders.

Current members 2022–23

Premier Division
Belstone
Buntingford Town
Bush Hill Rangers
Chipperfield Corinthians
Cockfosters Reserves
Colney Heath Reserves
Cuffley
Glenn Sports
Harefield United Reserves
Hatfield Town
Hertford Heath
Hinton
Hoddesdon Town Reserves
Oracle Components
Royston Town U23
Sandridge Rovers
St Albans City Reserves
Ware Sports
Wingate & Finchley Development

Division One
Apsley Argyle
Baldock Town Reserves
Bovingdon Reserves
Edgware & Kingsbury Reserve Senior
Evergreen
Harpenden Town Development
Hatfield United
Hertford Heath Development
Knebworth
L7
Lemsford
London Lions Development
Old Parmiterians
Waltham Cross
Welwyn Garden City U21

Division Two
Broxbourne Badgers
Bushey Rangers (Sat)
Chesham United (Youth) Generals
Chipperfield Corinthians Reserves
Cuffley Reserves
Hatfield Athletic
Hemel Hempstead Rovers
Hinton & Finchley Revolution U23
Letchworth Garden City Eagles U23
Little Heath (Sat)
Oxhey
Sandridge Rovers Reserves
Totteridge & Whetstone U23 XI
Westmill
Wormley Rovers

Division Three
Allenburys Sports
Bedmond
Bovingdon 'A'
Buntingford Town Reserves
Chorleywood Common
Croxley Green
Evergreen Reserves
Hadley (Sat) Veterans
Harpenden Colts
Hatfield Town Reserves
Hinton Reserves
Lemsford Reserves
Oxhey Jets
Sarratt Reserves
Sun Sports
Tring Corinthians AFC

Division Four
Bengeo Trinity
Chesham United (Youth) Rangers
Chipperfield Corinthians Thirds
Croxley Green Reserves
Evergreen 'A'
Global AFC
Hemel Hempstead Rovers Reserves
Knebworth Reserves
Letchworth Garden City Eagles U21
Oxhey Jets Development
Oxhey Reserves
Rio Rovers (Sat)
Stanmore Jafferys
Sun Sports Reserves
Ware Sports Reserves
Welwyn Pegasus U23

External links
FA Full-Time
Archive Website

 
Football in Hertfordshire
1898 establishments in England
Football leagues in England
Sports leagues established in 1898